The 90th Regiment of Foot was a line infantry regiment of the British Army during the American Revolutionary War.

History
The regiment was raised in Yorkshire in October 1779 and was posted to the Leeward Islands under the command of General Loftus Anthony Tottenham, arriving in January 1780.

It returned to England in 1783 and was disbanded in Yorkshire the following year.

References

Military units and formations established in 1779
Military units and formations disestablished in 1784
Infantry regiments of the British Army
Regiments of the British Army in the American Revolutionary War